Eumenes  may refer to:

 Eumenes of Cardia (c. 362 BC - 316 BC), a general and scholar in Ancient Greece
 Several members of the ruling Attalid dynasty of Pergamon
 Eumenes I (ruled 263 BC - 241 BC)
 Eumenes II (ruled 197 BC - 160 BC)
 Eumenes III (died 129 BC), illegitimate son of Eumenes II and pretender to the throne
 Eumenes, a late third century BC sculptor of the Pergamene school
 Eumenes of Bactria, an associate king of Antimachus I of Baktria 
 Saint Eumenes, a 7th-century bishop of Gortyna 
 Eumenes (wasp), a genus of potter wasps